State Highway 31 (SH-31) is a  north-south state highway in the eastern part of the U.S. state of Idaho. SH-31 runs from U.S. Route 26 (US-26) in Swan Valley north to SH-33 in Victor. The highway is maintained by the Idaho Transportation Department. It is known as PIne Creek Road within Bonneville County. It is also known West Center Street in "downtown" Victor.

Route description
SH-31 begins at an intersection with US-26 in Swan Valley. The highway leaves Swan Valley to the northeast, crossing Rainey Creek and entering a rural part of Bonneville County. The route turns north before heading northwest, then turning north again. After crossing Pine Creek, SH-31 heads northeast and enters Targhee National Forest. The highway enters a mountainous region at this point, passing to the south of Stouts Mountain. SH-31 crosses North Pine Creek before crossing into Teton County. It passes the Pine Creek Campground before leaving Targhee National Forest. The highway enters a rural area and begins a more easterly course. It turns northeast into Victor, then turns east, becoming Center Street. SH-31 terminates at SH-33 in central Victor.

Major intersections

See also

 List of state highways in Idaho
 List of highways numbered 31

References

External links

031
Transportation in Bonneville County, Idaho
Transportation in Teton County, Idaho